Bynoe's prickly gecko (Heteronotia planiceps) is a species of gecko. It is endemic to Australia.

References

Heteronotia
Reptiles described in 1989
Geckos of Australia